Donald Cooksey (May 15, 1892 – August 19, 1977), was an American physicist who was associate director of the Lawrence Radiation Laboratory of the University of California at Berkeley.

Cooksey was the son of George Cooksey from Birmingham, England and Linda Dows from New York. After High School at the Thacher School in California, Donald Cooksey followed his brother Charlton Cooksey (a physics professor at Yale) and attended Yale and where he too became a physicist specializing in designing and building scientific instruments, especially detectors for measuring sub-atomic particles such as neutrons.  When Ernest O. Lawrence was at Yale during the 1920s, Cooksey and Lawrence became friends.  In 1932, after Lawrence had moved to Berkeley, California to set up the Radiation Laboratory there, Lawrence asked Cooksey to come to Berkeley to make detectors for use with Lawrence's cyclotrons.  Cooksey continued to be a close associate of Lawrence and became associate director of the Lawrence Radiation Laboratory of the University of California at Berkeley.

Donald Cooksey and his wife Milicent Sperry had a son Donald Dows Cooksey (born in 1944) and a daughter Helen Sperry Cooksey (born 1947) who became a surgeon.

References

External links

1892 births
1977 deaths
20th-century American physicists
Manhattan Project people
American scientific instrument makers
The Thacher School alumni
Yale University alumni
Fellows of the American Physical Society